Autopia is a race car track Disneyland attraction, in which patrons steer specially designed cars through an enclosed track. Versions of Autopia exist at Anaheim, California and Disneyland Paris in Marne-la-Vallée, France. There was also an Autopia at Hong Kong Disneyland on Lantau Island, Hong Kong before it closed on June 11, 2016. Other versions of the attraction can be found at the Magic Kingdom as the Tomorrowland Speedway and formerly at Tokyo Disneyland as the Grand Circuit Raceway.  A previous generation of Disneyland's Autopia operated for over a decade at the Walt Disney Hometown Museum in Marceline, Missouri; one of the retired cars is now on display.

The name Autopia is a portmanteau of the words "mobile uto." The term was later popularized in academic circles by British architecture critic Reyner Banham to describe Los Angeles in his 1971 book Los Angeles: The Architecture of Four Ecologies.

Disneyland Autopia 

The Disneyland Autopia, in one form or another, is one of the few current attractions that opened with the park on July 17, 1955. When it opened, it represented the future of what would become America's multilane limited-access highways, which were still being developed. President Eisenhower had yet to sign the Interstate Highway legislation at the time Disneyland opened.

Drivers can use the steering wheel along the track but the center rail will guide the cars along the track regardless of steering input. Drivers/children too short to depress the gas pedal are paired with taller individuals who can. Brakes are applied automatically when the driver releases the gas pedal.

The cars generate a moderate level of exhaust from the Honda GX gasoline engines that propel the cars. In 2000, it was replaced with a much larger Autopia sponsored by Chevron with many cars were replaced with Dusty, Suzy, and Sparky, the queue was even given animated dioramas  featuring the Chevron Cars.

History 
Before the park opened, the cars were tested without the bumpers, and were almost completely destroyed by the test drivers. Bumpers were fitted around the vehicle, but there were still problems with collisions, as a guide rail had yet to be implemented on the ride. Eventually the vehicles were fitted with spring-loaded bumpers to discourage collisions.

The first fleet of Autopia cars were dubbed "Mark I".  Throughout Disneyland's first few years, Autopia went through a few fleets, as the cars took much abuse.  Though basically the same look, they went through Mark I, II, III, and IV by 1958.  When the Monorail, Submarine Voyage, and Matterhorn debuted in 1959, so did a new fleet with an all-new look – the "Mark Vs". The next design, Mark VI, came in 1964.  It was at this time (1965) the center guide rail was first installed.  1967 brought another new design, the Mark VIIs, which cost $5,000 for each car and looked similar to the new Corvette Stingray.  They would remain in service through 1999, till a breed of Mark VIIIs would hit the Autopia roadway. The cars were manufactured by Intermountain Design, Utah 

The Tomorrowland version was not the only form of Autopia to exist at Disneyland. Other versions, separate from the Tomorrowland version, included the Midget Autopia, Fantasyland Autopia (Rescue Rangers Raceway), and Junior Autopia. Of these, the Tomorrowland Autopia existed the longest.

The Midget Autopia opened in 1957 and was manufactured by Arrow Development. It was the smallest and was the third Autopia track, after the Tomorrowland Autopia (1955) and the Junior Autopia in Fantasyland (1956). It was located next to the Storybook Land Canal Boats and the Motor Boat Cruise at the very edge of Fantasyland. Adults were not allowed on the ride. It was closed in 1966 and dismantled to make way for It's a Small World.

The ride was then donated to the city of Marceline, Missouri, where it operated in the Walt Disney Municipal Park for 11 years until parts were no longer available for the cars.  One of the cars is on display in the museum whereas the concrete track on which the cars ran was ultimately demolished in 2016 to facilitate replacement of the city pool. In 2015, the Walt Disney Hometown Museum made plans to recreate the ride next to the museum in downtown Marceline, launching a Kickstarter campaign to finance the project.  The project attracted a fraction of the $500,000 required to reconstruct the vehicles and track.

Unlike all other Autopia attractions, Midget Autopia was one of several of Arrow Development's "off-the-shelf" Arrowflite Tracked Auto Rides built at several amusement parks throughout the country, at least one of which still operates at Idlewild Park in Pennsylvania.

The Fantasyland Autopia began as the Junior Autopia in 1956. Unlike the original Autopia, the Junior Autopia track had a center guard rail. It closed in 1958, and reopened on January 1, 1959 as the expanded Fantasyland Autopia. It was a duplicate version of the Tomorrowland Autopia and featured the same theme of the original until March 1991, when part of the Disney's Afternoon Avenue makeover of Fantasyland, the ride was transformed into the Rescue Rangers Raceway. The theming was kept until the beginning of 1992, when the promotion ended. The ride remained open on an interim basis until September 7, 1999, when both the Tomorrowland and Fantasyland Autopias were closed.

In 2000, Disneyland replaced both existing Autopia tracks with a new, much larger Autopia sponsored by Chevron. The colorful Chevrolet Corvette Stingray-style cars were replaced by three different kinds of cars: Dusty, an off-road style car; Sparky, a sports car; and Suzy, a Volkswagen Beetle-style car. Each was designed to be tied into the Chevron line of animated 'Chevron Cars', and four versions of the Autopia cars were sold as toys during the 2000 summer season at Chevron stations nationwide. The queue featured animated dioramas featuring the Chevron Cars, and the ride's background music is taken directly from the park's former PeopleMover attraction, which had closed five years prior to the new Autopia's opening. The voice of Dusty the Autopia car is voiced by Matthew Howard, who is said to be (as of 2004) the youngest Disney ride announcer. In response to several minor incidents, the ride safety spiel was re-recorded in 2004 in order to remind parents to watch their children. New for the track was a short "off-road" section. Chevron's sponsorship ended in the summer of 2012, though the Chevron Cars still appeared in the attraction's preshow until Honda took over sponsorship, with all overt references to Chevron removed.

On January 11, 2016, the attraction closed for a new building, walkway (now painted blue, white, and silver), sign, vehicle paint schemes, minor vehicle modifications, and sponsor. The attraction reopened on April 29, 2016, with Honda as its new sponsor, replacing Chevron. In early 2017 all remaining Chevron references were all removed from the attraction. On March 24, 2017, Honda revealed ASIMO in the attraction. Asimo is accompanied by Bird and are in various scenes throughout the attraction, most of the scenes replaced the carpark, and various billboards.

Versions in other Disney parks

Magic Kingdom 

The second Disney theme park to open was Magic Kingdom. An opening day attraction, the Grand Prix Raceway was based on an international car race rather than the futuristic roadways of Autopia. The original sponsor was Goodyear, as it supplied all of the tires on the Mark VII vehicles.

The track length has been the subject of incorrect discussion over the years. Through aerial photography and research it has been determined that the attraction was never lengthened, but shortened 3 times. On opening day the track was approximately 3,118 feet. The attraction saw its length greatly reduced for the first time in 1974 for the construction of Space Mountain, with the two southern curves being shortened and the entire north portion of the track being reduced, thus shortening the ride to ~2,760 feet. An even larger section was removed to make room for Mickey's Toontown Fair sometime between late 1987 and early 1988, this time the track was reduced to ~2,191 feet. In 2012 the final curve was again shortened to make way for Dumbo the Flying Elephant diminishing the ride to ~2,119 feet. In the end, the current attraction has lost over 32% of its original length.

In 1994, the Grand Prix theme and name was dropped in favor of Tomorrowland Indy Speedway, but the track and vehicles remained the same, as new theming to coincide with the "New Tomorrowland" overlay was installed. However, The Walt Disney World Explorer application—both the original edition released in 1996 and the Second Edition released in 1998—used the original name for the attraction's slideshow topic in the application.

On December 20, 1999, Walt Disney Company and the Indianapolis Motor Speedway partnered to change the theme of the track. The ride was changed to add items from the famous Speedway, such as the famous Yard of Bricks, the Scoring Pylon, Gasoline Alley and the wheel and wing logo. The loading area featured panels with the three Indy events: the Indianapolis 500, the Brickyard 400 and the United States Grand Prix.

The name was changed in 2008 to Tomorrowland Speedway, resulting in the drop of the Indy portion of the title.

In 2019, the ride underwent more track adjustments to accommodate the addition of Tron Lightcycle Power Run, (which is under the name of TRON: Lightcycle/Run). The attraction reopened on May 18, 2019.

Tokyo Disneyland 

At Tokyo Disneyland, the ride was known as Grand Circuit Raceway. This version of the ride opened with the park in 1983 and remained largely unchanged. The ride was sponsored by Bridgestone and featured a grandstand for visitors to watch the "races" between drivers. The track was described as a "figure eight" shape, but was actually quite longer. A new ride, Aquatopia, opened at neighboring park Tokyo DisneySea in 2001, but other than the name similarity to the Disneyland car ride (it is a homage) Aquatopia is closer (as an attraction) to Disneyland's former Motor Boat Cruise. Tokyo Disneyland's version closed on January 11, 2017 to make way for a Beauty and the Beast themed area.

Disneyland Paris 
In Disneyland Park in Paris, the attraction, which opened with Euro Disneyland on April 12, 1992, uses the original Disneyland name of Autopia, but has a unique sense of style and theming. The cars are more rounded to go with a 1920s retro-futuristic theme. 

This is also the only Autopia style attraction to have a storyline. The story was that the guests drove their cars, called "Astrocoupes", around a nearby city to Discoveryland, "Solaria".

In 2012, the "Solaria" prop was removed from the attraction and all Discoveryland logos were removed from the fleet of cars. The original storyline was also removed, turning it into a simple driving track, just like its American and Asian counterparts.

Hong Kong Disneyland 

Hong Kong Disneyland is the first Disneyland-style park to not open with a form of the Autopia. Opened in summer 2006 as part of its phase one expansion, the Hong Kong version is different from the other versions as it features electric cars with lighting effects  and an onboard audio system. Theming includes a lush jungle and alien landscapes. Honda is the sponsor of the attraction. Hong Kong Disneyland's Autopia closed on June 11, 2016 to be replaced by "Avengers Quinjet Experience", as part of "Stark Expo".

See also 
 List of Disneyland attractions
 List of Magic Kingdom attractions
 List of Tokyo Disneyland attractions
 List of Disneyland Park (Paris) attractions
 List of Hong Kong Disneyland attractions

References

External links 
 Disneyland – Autopia
 Magic Kingdom – Tomorrowland Speedway
 Disneyland Park (Paris) – Autopia

Walt Disney Parks and Resorts attractions
Disneyland
Magic Kingdom
Tokyo Disneyland
Disneyland Park (Paris)
Tomorrowland
Amusement rides introduced in 1955
Amusement rides introduced in 1971
Amusement rides introduced in 1983
Amusement rides introduced in 1992
Amusement rides introduced in 2006
1955 establishments in California